Anup is an Indian masculine given name. The Sanskrit word  has the following meanings: 'watery', 'situated near the water', 'bank of a river', 'pond', 'lagoon'.The meaning of the name “Anup” is: "Incomparable, unequalled; unique; pond.

Notable people

Anup
Anup Baral (born 1968), actor, writer, director of Nepal
Anup Bhandari, writer, director, music director, lyricist and actor who works primarily in Kannada cinema
Anup Chetia (real name Golap Baruah), General Secretary of the banned United Liberation Front of Assam in Assam
Anup Singh Choudry (born 1949), Sikh writer formerly based in the United Kingdom who was also a justice of the High Court of Uganda
Anup Das (born 1964), Indian former cricketer
Anup Dave (born 1981), Indian first-class cricketer who represented Rajasthan
Anup D'Costa (born 1993), Indian volleyball player
Anup Ghatak (1941–2013), Indian cricketer
Anup Ghoshal (born 1949), singer in Hindi films and other vernacular Indian films
Anup Jalota (born 1953), Indian singer/musician, best known for his performances of the bhajan and the ghazal
Anup Kumar (actor) (1932–1997), actor from India
Anup Kumar (politician), Fiji Indian politician who won the Vanua Levu West Indian Communal Constituency
Anup Kumar Saha, member of the Parliament of India
Anup Kumar Yama (born 1984), Indian Roller Skate Athlete
Anup Menon or Anoop Menon, Indian film actor, screenwriter and lyricist
Anup Mishra or Anoop Mishra (born 1956), Indian politician from the Bharatiya Janata Party
Anup Paul, English singer, songwriter, producer, engineer, mixer and recording artist from Rayners Lane, United Kingdom
Anup Phukan, former member of Asom Gana Parishad politician from Assam
Anup Rai, Bargujar Rajput nobleman in seventeenth century India, courtier of the Mughal emperor, Jahangir
Anup Singh Choudry (born 1950), Sikh writer and businessman, now a High Court judge in Uganda
Anup Soni (born 1965), Indian film and television actor
Anup Sridhar (born 1983), male badminton player from India
Anup Upadhyay, Indian actor, known for his work in serials
Anup Lal Yadav (1923–2013), Indian politician
Anup Kumar Yama (born 1984), Indian roller skate athlete
Anup-Anoop R Nair (born 1988), Pianist, Performer, Indian Music Producer who has worked around 300 plus Indian Movies.

Anoop kumar singh bhumihar brahman 
Anoop Desai (born 1986), American singer-songwriter
Anoop Jacob (born 1977), Indian politician
Anoop Kumar (1929–1997), Indian actor
Anoop Kumar Mittal (born 1960), Indian engineer 
Anoop Malhotra (born 1955), Indian general
Anoop Menon (born 1977), Indian actor
Anoop Suri (born 1971), Indian hotel manager
Anoop Swarup (born 1959), Indian academic

See also
Anup Kumar (disambiguation)
Anup Nagar, census town in West Bengal, India

References

Indian masculine given names

de:Anup